The 2004–05 Eredivisie season was the 45th season of the Eredivisie in basketball, the highest professional basketball league in the Netherlands. Demon Astronauts from Amsterdam won their 5th national title.

Regular season
MPC Capitals
Demon Astronauts
EiffelTowers Nijmegen
Tulip Den Bosch
Landstede Basketbal
BC Noordkop
Woon! Aris
Myleasecar.nl Giants
Rotterdam Basketbal
BS Weert
BC Omniworld Almere

Playoffs

Dutch Basketball League seasons
1
Netherlands